Premiership of Winston Churchill may refer to:
 First premiership of Winston Churchill (1940–1945), his first, wartime term as British prime minister
 Second premiership of Winston Churchill (1951–1955), his second, peacetime term as British prime minister

See also
 Churchill ministry (disambiguation)
 Timeline of Winston Churchill's first premiership
 Winston Churchill in the Second World War